"Chain" is an EP released by Bonnie Pink under the Warner Music Japan label on November 26, 2008.

Track listing 

2008 EPs
Bonnie Pink albums
2008 Christmas albums
Christmas albums by Japanese artists
Warner Music Japan EPs
Pop rock Christmas albums